The 50s progression (also known as the "Heart and Soul" chords, the "Stand by Me" changes, the doo-wop progression and the "ice cream changes") is a chord progression and turnaround used in Western popular music. The progression, represented in Roman numeral analysis, is: I–vi–IV–V. For example, in C major: C–Am–F–G. As the name implies, it was common in the 1950s and early 1960s and is particularly associated with doo-wop.

Theory
In Western classical music during the common practice period, chord progressions are used to structure a musical composition. The destination of a chord progression is known as a cadence, or two chords that signify the end or prolongation of a musical phrase. The most conclusive and resolving cadences return to the tonic or I chord; following the circle of fifths, the most suitable chord to precede the I chord is a V chord. This particular cadence, V–I, is known as an authentic cadence. However, since a I–V–I progression is repetitive and skips most of the circle of fifths, it is common practice to precede the dominant chord with a suitable predominant chord, such as a IV chord or a ii chord (in major), in order to maintain interest. In this case, the 50s progression uses a IV chord, resulting in the ubiquitous I–IV–V–I progression. The vi chord before the IV chord in this progression (creating I–vi–IV–V–I) is used as a means to prolong the tonic chord, as the vi or submediant chord is commonly used as a substitute for the tonic chord, and to ease the voice leading of the bass line: in a I–vi–IV–V–I progression (without any chordal inversions) the bass voice descends in major or minor thirds from the I chord to the vi chord to the IV chord.

Variations
As with any other chord progression, there are many possible variations, for example turning the dominant or V into a V7, or repeated I–vi progression followed by a single IV–V progression. A very common variation is having ii substitute for the subdominant, IV, creating the progression I–vi–ii–V (a variant of the circle progression) and thus the ii–V–I turnaround.

Variations include switching the vi and the IV chord to create I–IV–vi–V, as is used in "More Than a Feeling" by Boston and "She Drives Me Crazy" by Fine Young Cannibals. This is also similar to the I–V–vi–IV progression.

The harmonic rhythm, or the pace at which the chords occur, may be varied including two beats (half-measure) per chord, four (full measure or bar), eight (two measures), and eight beats per chord except for IV and V(7) which get four each.

"Sleep Walk" by Santo & Johnny uses a similar progression, with the IV replaced by its parallel minor iv for an overall progression of I–vi–iv–V.

Examples in popular music
This is a partial list of recorded songs containing the '50s progression. The list does not include songs containing the progression for very short, irrelevant sections of the songs, nor does it include remade recordings of songs by other artists.

Examples in classical music
Instances of the I–vi–IV–V progression date back to the 17th century, for example, the ostinato bass line of Dieterich Buxtehude's setting of Psalm 42, Quem admodum desiderat cervus, BuxWV 92: 
The opening of J. S. Bach's Cantata "Wachet Auf":

The progression is found frequently in works by Mozart. At the end of the slow movement of his Piano Concerto No. 24, K. 491, the progression is spelled out in arpeggios played by the bassoon:

The opening of his Piano Concerto No. 22, K. 482 extends the progression in a particularly subtle way, making use of suspensions:

Eric Blom (1935, p. 227) hears this passage as "the height of cunning contrivance resulting in what is apparently quite simple and obvious, but what could have occurred to nobody else."

See also
 Doo-wop
 Pachelbel's Canon
 I–V–vi–IV progression
 Roman numeral analysis

Sources

Chord progressions
Doo-wop